Anthidium anurospilum is a species of bee in the family Megachilidae, the leaf-cutter, carder, or mason bees.

References

anurospilum
Insects described in 1957